MTV Base: SA's Hottest MCs is an annual segment that has aired on MTV Base at the end of every year since 2014. The segment consists of a panel of judges who are South African hip hop performers or personalities associated with the South African hip hop genre. The finalists of the list are judged based on impact, lyrics, sales, buzz, style and intangibles.

2014 
The inaugural edition of the Hottest MCs list was revealed at a two day event on 19–20 November 2014, hosted by Sizwe Dlomo.

 K.O
 Cassper Nyovest
 AKA
 Khuli Chana
 Riky Rick
 Reason 
 Kid X
 Da L.E.S
 Kwesta
 Maggz

2015 
The 2015 list was revealed on 26–27 November 2015.

 Cassper Nyovest
 AKA
 K.O
 Riky Rick
 Okmalumkoolkat
 Kwesta
 Khuli Chana
 Kid X
 iFani
 L-Tido

2016 
The 2016 list was revealed at a two-day event airing 1-2 December 2016.

 Cassper Nyovest
 Emtee
 Nasty C
 Kwesta
 AKA
 Riky Rick
 Fifi Cooper
 A-Reece
 Okmalumkoolkat
 Gigi LaMayne

2017 
The 2017 list was announced at a two-day event on 30 November-1 December 2017.

 Kwesta
 Cassper Nyovest
 AKA
 Nasty C
 Emtee
 Shane Eagle
 Riky Rick
 Okmalumkoolkat
 A-Reece
 YoungstaCPT
 MrNytmares

2018 
The 2018 list was announced 6 December 2018.

 Kwesta
 AKA
 Nasty C
 Cassper Nyovest
 Rouge
 Shane Eagle
 Anatii
 Riky Rick
 Moozlie
 Nadia Nakai

2019 
The 2019 list was announced on 11–12 December 2019.

 Nasty C
 Sho Madjozi
 Yanga Chief
 AKA
 YoungstaCPT
 Kwesta
 Shane Eagle
 K.O and Riky Rick
 Nadia Nakai
 Boity

2020 
The 2020 list was announced on 3–4 December 2020 in an event hosted by Ms Cosmo.

 Focalistic
 Yanga Chief
 Nasty C
 Cassper Nyovest
 Big Zulu
 YoungstaCPT
 Busiswa
 Costa Titch
 Riky Rick
 K.O

2021 
The 2021 list was announced on 3–4 December 2021 in an event hosted by Tshego Koke.

 Blxckie
 Big Zulu
 Nasty C
 A-Reece
 25K
 K.O & Riky Rick
 Costa Titch
 Lucas Raps
 Priddy Ugly
 Dee Koala

References 

2014 American television series debuts
2015 American television series endings
MTV original programming